Tari may refer to:

Places
 Tari, Papua New Guinea, a town in the Hela Province of Papua New Guinea
 Tari Urban LLG, a local-level government area of Papua New Guinea
 Tari, Siliguri, a census town in Dajeeling district, West Bengal, India
 Tari Airport, Papua New Guinea
 El Tari Airport, Indonesia

People
 Tari (name)
 Tari (Kashmiri tribe), a Kashmiri tribe and family name in India and Pakistan

Other uses
 Tarì, a coin minted in Sicily, Malta and south Italy from about 913 to 1859 
 Tari, a character in the Meta Runner and SMG4 series 
 Taiwan Agricultural Research institute (TARI), an agricultural research institute in Taiwan

See also
 Tari Tari, a 2012 Japanese anime television series
 Tary (disambiguation)
 Thari (disambiguation)